Abagor, and its colloquial form Bagor, is an old and rare Russian male first name. Included into various, often handwritten, church calendars throughout the 17th–19th centuries, it was omitted from the official Synodal Menologium at the end of the 19th century. It is possibly derived from Biblical Hebrew where it meant father of Gor. The patronymics derived from this first name are "" (Abagorovich; masculine) and "" (Abagorovna; feminine).

References

Notes

Sources
Н. А. Петровский (N. A. Petrovsky). "Словарь русских личных имён" (Dictionary of Russian First Names). ООО Издательство "АСТ". Москва, 2005. 
А. В. Суперанская (A. V. Superanskaya). "Словарь русских имён" (Dictionary of Russian Names). Издательство Эксмо. Москва, 2005. 

Russian masculine given names